Kelowna-Mission is a provincial electoral district for the Legislative Assembly of British Columbia, Canada.

Demographics

Geography
As of the 2020 provincial election, Kelowna-Mission comprises the southeastern portion of the Regional District of Central Okanagan. This includes the southern area of the city of Kelowna. It is located in southern British Columbia.

History

1999 redistribution
The district's name was changed from Okanagan West to Kelowna-Mission.

Members of the Legislative Assembly

History 

Kelowna-Mission's MLA is Renee Merrifield. She was first elected to represent the riding in the 2020 provincial election. She is a member of the British Columbia Liberal Party.

Prior to Renee Merrifield, the MLA was Hon. Steve Thomson, the former executive director of the B.C. Agriculture Council. He was first elected to represent the riding in the 2009 provincial election, and was a member of the British Columbia Liberal Party.

Thomson was appointed Minister for Agriculture and Lands on June 10, 2009. He was elected to represent the riding of Kelowna-Mission on May 12, 2009.

Election results 

|-

 
|NDP
|Tisha Kalmanovich
|align="right"|5,566
|align="right"|26.07
|align="right"|
|align="right"|$21,149

|Independent
|Silverado Socrates
|align="right"|130
|align="right"|0.61
|align="right"|
|align="right"|$250

|}

|-

|-
 
|NDP
|Nicki Hokazono
|align="right"|8,189
|align="right"|31.82%
|align="right"|
|align="right"|$33,490

|}

|-

|-
 
|NDP
|Assunta Rosal
|align="right"|3,066
|align="right"|12.90%
|align="right"|
|align="right"|$9,609

|}

References

External links 
BC Stats Profile - 2001 (pdf)
Results of 2001 election (pdf)
2001 Expenditures
Website of the Legislative Assembly of British Columbia

British Columbia provincial electoral districts
Politics of Kelowna